Fiamē Mataafa Faumuina Mulinuu II  (5 August 1921 – 20 May 1975) was a Western Samoan paramount chief and politician. The holder of the Mataafa title, one of the four main Samoan chieftainships, he became the first prime minister of Western Samoa in 1959, serving until 1970. He held the position again from 1973 until his death in 1975.

Biography
Mata'afa was born in 1921, the son of Paramount Chief Mata'afa Faumuina Fiame Mulinu'u I. He was educated at the Marist Brothers school in Apia. He married Laulu Fetauimalemau Mata'afa, a teacher educated in New Zealand and who later became Samoa's High Commissioner (1993–1997) to New Zealand. He was bestowed with the Fiame title in 1948, and also became a Faumuina. When his father died in 1948, he acceded to the Mata'afa title. He was a senior grade rugby player and President of the Western Samoan Boys' Brigade.

After it was agreed in the 1954 Constitutional Convention that two of the four paramount chiefs, Tupua Tamasese Meaʻole and Malietoa Tanumafili II, should be made joint heads of state for life, he announced that he would withdraw from public life. However, he later backed down and contested the 1957 elections to the Legislative Assembly, winning the Lotofaga seat.

Following the elections, Mata'afa was appointed to the Executive Council as Minister of Agriculture. When formal cabinet government was introduced in 1959, he became the first Prime Minister, defeating Leader of Government Business Eugene Paul and Tualaulelei Mauri in a vote. He was appointed a Commander of the Order of the British Empire in the 1960 Queen's Birthday Honours.

Mata'afa was re-elected Prime Minister following the 1961 elections, leading the country to independence in 1962. He was re-elected again following elections in 1964 and 1967. However, after the 1970 elections, he was defeated by Tupua Tamasese Lealofi IV by 25 votes to 20 in the third round of voting. It was reported that he would have probably won in the second round (which was tied at 23 votes each) if one of his supporters, To'omata Lilomaiava Tua, had not died the previous week.

In February 1966, Mata'afa ordered that the sport of cricket be banned on every day except Wednesdays and Saturdays, because of the "lackadaisical approach" taken to the clean-up after a cyclone.

Following the 1973 elections, Mata'afa returned as Prime Minister, defeating Lealofi and Tupuola Efi in the first round of voting. He served as Prime Minister until his death in May 1975. His wife Laulu won the subsequent by-election for his Lotofaga seat. His daughter Fiamē Naomi Mataafa also later became an MP, and served as Deputy Prime Minister of Samoa from 2016 until her resignation in 2020 after which she would end up as Samoa's first female Prime Minister in 2021.

References

External links
Malama Meleisea & Penelope Schoeffel Meleisea Lagaga: a short history of Western Samoa
Morgan A. Tuimalealiʻifano O tama a ʻāiga: the politics of succession to Sāmoa's paramount titles

1921 births
People from Atua (district)
Samoan chiefs
Members of the Legislative Assembly of Samoa
Government ministers of Samoa
Prime Ministers of Samoa
Commanders of the Order of the British Empire
1975 deaths
Mataʻafa family